Ornithophobia is the abnormal and irrational fear of birds, as well as a type of specific phobia. The term may also refer to strong dislike of birds. People with Ornithophobia are often afraid of specific types of birds, for example chickens, ducks, and/or pest birds in grain-producing areas. 

The prefix ornitho- signifies "of or pertaining to birds", from Ancient Greek ὄρνις (órnis, "bird").

Notable people
American rapper Eminem says he is afraid of owls. English footballer David Beckham and American actress Scarlett Johansson also have ornithophobia. Other people with the fear have included: 
Ingmar Bergman
Niall Horan
Chris Fehn
Lucille Ball
Trae Young

See also
List of phobias

References

Zoophobias
Bird problems with humans
Anxiety disorders